Alen Roj (born 10 November 1992) is a Slovenian badminton player. In 2015, he became the runner-up of Egypt International tournament in the men's singles event. In 2020, he was appointed as a coach in Luxembourg national team. He is married German badminton player, Olga Konon in 2018.

Achievements

BWF International Challenge/Series (6 runners-up) 
Men's singles

Men's doubles

  BWF International Challenge tournament
  BWF International Series tournament
  BWF Future Series tournament

References

External links 
 

1992 births
Living people
Sportspeople from Maribor
Slovenian male badminton players
Slovenian expatriate sportspeople in Luxembourg
Badminton coaches
21st-century Slovenian people